Carlo Adriano García Prades (born 12 February 2001), known as Carlo Adriano, is a Spanish footballer who plays as a central midfielder for Villarreal CF.

Club career
Born in Villarreal, Castellón, Valencian Community, Carlo Adriano joined Villarreal CF's youth setup in 2010, from CD Benicasim. He made his senior debut with the C-team on 24 August 2019, starting in a 3–0 Tercera División away win against CF Recambios Colón.

Carlo Adriano scored his first senior goal on 1 September 2019, netting the game's only in a home success over CD Olímpic de Xàtiva. On 26 October, he scored a brace in a 5–0 home routing of UD Benigànim.

Ahead of the 2020–21 season, Carlo Adriano was assigned to the reserves in Segunda División B, and made his debut for the side on 18 October 2020 by starting in a 0–1 loss at SCR Peña Deportiva. He made his first team debut on 16 December, coming on as a late substitute for Juan Foyth in a 6–0 away routing of SD Leioa, for the season's Copa del Rey; by doing so, he became the sixth player born in Villarreal to debut for the club.

Carlo Adriano made his professional – and La Liga – debut on 3 January 2022, replacing fellow youth graduate Manu Trigueros in a 5–0 home routing of Levante UD.

Personal life
Carlo Adriano's father and brother were also footballers: the former, Adriano was also a forward, while the latter, Cristian, was a midfielder. Both were also groomed at Villarreal.

References

External links

2001 births
Living people
People from Villarreal
Sportspeople from the Province of Castellón
Spanish footballers
Footballers from the Valencian Community
Association football midfielders
La Liga players
Segunda División players
Primera Federación players
Segunda División B players
Tercera División players
Villarreal CF C players
Villarreal CF B players
Villarreal CF players
Spain youth international footballers